Food storage is a way of decreasing the variability of the food supply in the face of natural, inevitable variability. It allows food to be eaten for some time (typically weeks to months) after harvest rather than solely immediately. It is both a traditional domestic skill (mainly as root cellaring) and, in the form of food logistics, an important industrial and commercial activity. Food preservation, storage, and transport, including timely delivery to consumers, are important to food security, especially for the majority of people throughout the world who rely on others to produce their food. 

Significant losses of food are caused by inadequate storage conditions as well as decisions made at earlier stages of the supply chain, which predispose products to a shorter shelf life. Adequate cold storage, in particular, can be crucial to prevent quantitative and qualitative food losses.

Food is stored by almost every human society and by many animals. Storing of food has several main purposes:

Storage of harvested and processed plant and animal food products for distribution to consumers
Enabling a better balanced diet throughout the year
Reducing food waste by preserving unused or uneaten food for later use
Preserving pantry food, such as spices or dry ingredients like rice and flour, for eventual use in cooking
Preparedness for catastrophes, emergencies and periods of food scarcity or famine, whether as basic emergency preparedness (for most people) or in its more extreme form of survivalism (prepping)
Religious reasons: for example, leaders in the LDS Church (Church of Jesus Christ of Latter Day Saints) instruct church members to store food.
Protection from animals or theft

Domestic food storage

The safe storage of food for home use should strictly adhere to guidelines set out by reliable sources, such as the United States Department of Agriculture. These guidelines have been thoroughly researched by scientists to determine the best methods for reducing the real threat of food poisoning from unsafe food storage. It is also important to maintain proper kitchen hygiene, to reduce risks of bacteria or virus growth and food poisoning. The common food poisoning illnesses include Listeriosis, Mycotoxicosis, Salmonellosis, E. coli, Staphylococcal food poisoning and Botulism. There are many other organisms that can also cause food poisoning.

There are also safety guidelines available for the correct methods of home canning of food. For example, there are specific boiling times that apply depending upon whether pressure canning or waterbath canning is being used in the process. These safety guidelines are intended to reduce the growth of mold and bacteria and the threat of potentially-fatal food poisoning.

Food storage safety

Freezing food
To preserve food over long periods the temperature should be maintained below .  Careful thawing and cooking immediately after thawing are necessary to maintain the  safety of food 

Food frozen at  0 °F and below may be preserved almost indefinitely although the quality of the food is likely to deteriorate over time. The United States Department of Agriculture, Food Safety and Inspection Service publishes a chart showing the suggested freezer storage time for common foods.

Refrigeration
Food storage in refrigerators may not be safe unless there is close adherence to temperature guidelines.

Safe storage times vary from food to food and may depend on how the food has been treated prior to being placed in the refrigerator.

Storing oils and fats
Oils and fats can begin to go rancid quickly when not stored safely. Rancid cooking oils and fats do not often smell rancid until well after they have spoiled. Oxygen, light and heat all contribute to cooking oils becoming rancid. The higher the level of polyunsaturated fat that an oil contains, the faster it spoils. The percentage of polyunsaturated fat in some common cooking oils is: safflower (74%); sunflower (66%); corn (60%); soybean (37%); peanut (32%); canola (29%); olive (8%); coconut (5%).

To help preserve oils from rancidification, they should be stored in a dark place, stored in oxygen-safe, light-reducing containers (e.g. dark glass or metal). Once opened, oils should be refrigerated and used within a few weeks, when some types begin to go rancid. Unopened oils can have a storage life of up to one year, but some types have a shorter shelf-life even when unopened (such as sesame and flaxseed).

Dry storage of foods

Vegetables
The guidelines vary for safe storage of vegetables under dry conditions. This is because different vegetables have different characteristics, for example, tomatoes contain a lot of water, while root vegetables such as carrots and potatoes contain less. These factors, and many others, affect the amount of time that a vegetable can be kept in dry storage, as well as the temperature needed to preserve its usefulness. The following guideline shows the required dry storage conditions:

 Cool and dry: onion
 Cool and moist: root vegetable, potato, cabbage
 Warm and dry: winter squash, pumpkin, sweet potatoes, dried hot peppers

Grain
Grain, which includes dry kitchen ingredients such as flour, rice, millet, couscous, cornmeal, and so on, can be stored in rigid sealed containers to prevent moisture contamination or insect or rodent infestation. For kitchen use, glass containers are the most traditional method. During the 20th century plastic containers were introduced for kitchen use. They are now sold in a vast variety of sizes and designs.

Metal cans are used (in the United States the smallest practical grain storage uses closed-top #10 metal cans). Storage in grain sacks is ineffective; mold and pests destroy a 25 kg cloth sack of grain in a year, even if stored off the ground in a dry area. On the ground or damp concrete, grain can spoil in as little as three days, and the grain might have to be dried before it can be milled. Food stored under unsuitable conditions should not be purchased or used because of risk of spoilage. To test whether grain is still good, it can be sprouted. If it sprouts, it is still good, but if not, it should not be eaten. It may take up to a week for grains to sprout. When in doubt about the safety of the food, throw it out as quickly as possible.

Spices and herbs
Spices and herbs are today often sold prepackaged in a way that is convenient for pantry storage. The packaging has dual purposes of both storing and dispensing the spices or herbs. They are sold in small glass or plastic containers or resealable plastic packaging. When spices or herbs are homegrown or bought in bulk, they can be stored at home in glass or plastic containers. They can be stored for extended periods, in some cases for years. However, after 6 months to a year, spices and herbs will gradually lose their flavour as oils they contain will slowly evaporate during storage.

Spices and herbs can be preserved in vinegar for short periods of up to a month without losing flavor, creating a flavoured vinegar.

Alternative methods for preserving herbs include freezing in water or unsalted butter. Herbs can be chopped and added to water in an ice cube tray.  After freezing, the ice cubes are emptied into a plastic freezer bag for storing in the freezer. Herbs also can be stirred into a bowl with unsalted butter, then spread on wax paper and rolled into a cylinder shape. The wax paper roll containing the butter and herbs is then stored in a freezer, and can be cut off in the desired amount for cooking. Using either of these techniques, the herbs should be used within a year.

Meat
Unpreserved meat has only a relatively short life in storage. Perishable meats should be refrigerated, frozen, dried promptly or cured. Storage of fresh meats is a complex discipline that affects the costs, storage life and eating quality of the meat, and the appropriate techniques vary with the kind of meat and the particular requirements. For example, dry ageing techniques are sometimes used to tenderize gourmet meats by hanging them in carefully controlled environments for up to 21 days, while game animals of various kinds may be hung after shooting. Details depend on personal tastes and local traditions. Modern techniques of preparing meat for storage vary with the type of meat and special requirements of tenderness, flavour, hygiene, and economy.

Semi-dried meats like salamis and country style hams are processed first with salt, smoke, sugar, acid, or other "cures" then hung in cool dry storage for extended periods, sometimes exceeding a year. Some of the materials added during the curing of meats serve to reduce the risks of food poisoning from anaerobic bacteria such as species of Clostridium that release botulinum toxin that can cause botulism. Typical ingredients of curing agents that inhibit anaerobic bacteria include nitrates. Such salts are dangerously poisonous in their own right and must be added in carefully controlled quantities and according to proper techniques. Their proper use has however saved many lives and much food spoilage.

Like the semi-dried meats, most salted, smoked, and simply-dried meats of different kinds that once were staples in particular regions, now are largely luxury snacks or garnishes; examples include jerky, biltong, and varieties of pemmican, but ham and bacon for instance, still are staples in many communities.

Food rotation
Food rotation is important to preserve freshness. When food is rotated, the food that has been in storage the longest is used first. As food is used, new food is added to the pantry to replace it; the essential rationale is to use the oldest food as soon as possible so that nothing is in storage too long and becomes unsafe to eat. Labelling food with paper labels on the storage container, marking the date that the container is placed in storage, can make this practice simpler.

For emergency preparation
Guides for surviving emergency conditions in many parts of the world recommend maintaining a store of essential foods; typically water, cereals, oil, dried milk, and protein rich foods such as beans, lentils, tinned meat and fish. A food storage calculator can be used to help determine how much of these staple foods a person would need to store in order to sustain life for one full year.  In addition to storing the basic food items many people choose to supplement their food storage with frozen or preserved garden-grown fruits and vegetables and freeze-dried or canned produce. An unvarying diet of staple foods prepared in the same manner can cause appetite exhaustion, leading to less caloric intake. Another benefit to having a basic supply of food storage in the home is for the potential cost savings.  Costs of dry bulk foods (before preparation) are often considerably less than convenience and fresh foods purchased at local markets or supermarkets. There is a significant market in convenience foods for campers, such as dehydrated food products.

Commercial food logistics

Grain and beans are stored in tall grain elevators, almost always at a rail head near the point of production.  The grain is shipped to a final user in hopper cars.  In the former Soviet Union, where harvest was poorly controlled, grain was often irradiated at the point of production to suppress mold and insects. In the U.S., threshing and drying is performed in the field, and transport is nearly sterile and in large containers that effectively suppresses pest access, which eliminates the need for irradiation.  At any given time, the U.S. usually has about two weeks worth of stored grains for the population.

Fresh fruits and vegetables are sometimes packed in plastic packages and cups for fresh premium markets, or placed in large plastic tubs for sauce and soup processors.  Fruits and vegetables are usually refrigerated at the earliest possible moment, and even so have a shelf life of two weeks or less.

In the United States, livestock is usually transported live, slaughtered at a major distribution point, hung and transported for two days to a week in refrigerated rail cars, and then butchered and sold locally.  Before refrigerated rail cars, meat had to be transported live, and this placed its cost so high that only farmers and the wealthy could afford it every day. In Europe much meat is transported live and slaughtered close to the point of sale. In much of Africa and Asia most meat is for local populations is raised, slaughtered and eaten locally, which is believed to be less stressful for the animals involved and minimizes meat storage needs. In Australia and New Zealand, where a large proportion of meat production is for export, meat enters the cold chain early, being stored in large freezer plants before being shipped overseas in freezer ships.

Food storage facilities

Food storage facilities may include those used for dry goods, or in canning, Food dehydration, pickling, curing and more. They include:
Pantry
Larder
Root cellar

Fully dedicated food storage facilities include:
Cool store — a large refrigerated room or building 
Cool warehouse — a very large refrigerated building 
Silo — used to store grains, like wheat and maize
2800 Polar Way — world's largest food freezer

See also

 Canning
 Home canning
 Candying
 Food science
 Food and Bioprocess Technology
 Food chemistry
 Food engineering
 Food safety
 Food microbiology
 Food technology
 Dietary supplement
 Food dehydration
 Food fortification
 Food preservation
 Food rheology
 Food storage container
 Food packaging
 Food supplement
 Hoarding (animal behavior)
 Nutraceutical
 Pickling
 Preserves
 Root cellar
 Shaker-style pantry box

Sources

References

External links
 US Government Food Safety Guidelines
 USDA Resources for Food Safety and Storage
 Food Storage: Refrigerator and Freezer
 Food Storage Guidelines For Consumers

 
Food packaging